Michel Enríquez Tamayo (born February 11, 1979 in Nueva Gerona, Isla de la Juventud) is a retired Cuban baseball third baseman.

Biography and career
Enríquez, who plays third base for Isla de la Juventud in the Cuban National Series, led the league in batting average and slugging percentage in the 2005-06 season, at .447 and .690, respectively. Enríquez is a roster fixture at third base for the Cuban national baseball team.

He holds National Series records for hits (152) and doubles (35) in a season (1999, 90 games), and was part of Cuba's gold medal-winning team at the 2004 Summer Olympics and the second place team at the 2006 World Baseball Classic.
He has one brother and one sister.

Enríquez was left off of Cuba's roster for the 2000 Olympics, with some speculating fear of defection and others opining that it was due to Michel's youth (still just 21 years old) and lack of experience in international tournaments relative to some of the other available options. He hit .353/.451/.595 in the 2000-2001 Serie Nacional.

In 2017, while playing for Vegueros de Pinar del Río, Enríquez collected his 2000th professional hit.

References

 
 
 

1979 births
Living people
Olympic baseball players of Cuba
Olympic silver medalists for Cuba
Olympic gold medalists for Cuba
Olympic medalists in baseball
Medalists at the 2004 Summer Olympics
Medalists at the 2008 Summer Olympics
Baseball players at the 2004 Summer Olympics
Baseball players at the 2008 Summer Olympics
Baseball players at the 2011 Pan American Games
Pan American Games bronze medalists for Cuba
Pan American Games gold medalists for Cuba
Baseball players at the 1999 Pan American Games
Baseball players at the 2003 Pan American Games
2006 World Baseball Classic players
2009 World Baseball Classic players
People from Nueva Gerona
Piratas de Campeche players
Isla de la Juventud players
Pan American Games medalists in baseball
Central American and Caribbean Games gold medalists for Cuba
Competitors at the 2006 Central American and Caribbean Games
Central American and Caribbean Games medalists in baseball
Medalists at the 1999 Pan American Games
Medalists at the 2003 Pan American Games
21st-century Cuban people